Bachhayauli  is a village development committee in Chitwan District in Bagmati Province of southern Nepal. At the time of the 1991 Nepal census it had a population of 8338 people living in 1356 individual households.

References

Populated places in Chitwan District